Events in the year 1567 in Spain.

Incumbents
Monarch: Philip II

Births
November 1 - Diego Sarmiento de Acuña, 1st Count of Gondomar, Spanish diplomat, ambassador to England 1613-1622 (d. 1626)

References

 
1560s in Spain